The 2011–12 NBL season was the 34th season of competition since its establishment in 1979. A total of nine teams contested the league. The regular season was played between 7 October 2011 and 25 March 2012, followed by a post-season involving the top four in April 2012. The schedule was announced on 19 May 2011. The New Zealand Breakers successfully defended their 2010–11 title.

Broadcast rights were held by free-to-air network Channel Ten and its digital sports sister station One, in the second year of a five-year deal, through to the 2014–15 season. In New Zealand, Sky Sport once again provided coverage.

Sponsorship included iiNet entering its second and penultimate year as league naming rights sponsor and Centrebet in the final year as the official sports betting partner. Spalding provided equipment including the official game ball, with AND1 supplying team apparel and New Era headwear.

Pre-season
NBL Sunshine State Challenge, a round robin competition with a final series, involving all nine sides, was held between September 22–24, 2011 in Rockhampton, Ipswich, on the Gold Coast and Brisbane. Perth Wildcats were pre-season champions for the second year in a row.

New Zealand Breakers pre-season

Gold Coast Blaze pre-season

Cairns Taipans pre-season

2011 China Intercontinental Club Championship

Final

Sydney Kings pre-season

Melbourne Tigers pre-season

Wollongong Hawks pre-season

Perth Wildcats pre-season

2011 Cable Beach Invitational 

Perth vs. Singapore cancelled due to poor condition of the outdoor court.

Townsville Crocodiles pre-season

Adelaide 36ers pre-season

2011 NBL Sunshine State Challenge

Finals 

Perth Wildcats win Sunshine State Challenge.

Regular season

Round 1

Round 2

Round 3

Round 4

Round 5

Round 6

Round 7

Round 8

Round 9

Round 10

Round 11

Round 12

Round 13

Round 14

Round 15

Round 16

Round 17

Round 18

Round 19

Round 20

Round 21

Round 22

Round 23

Round 24

Round 25

Ladder

The NBL tie-breaker system as outlined in the NBL Rules and Regulations states that in the case of an identical win–loss record, the results in games played between the teams will determine order of seeding.

1Head-to-head between Townsville Crocodiles and Cairns Taipans (2-2). Townsville Crocodiles won For and Against (+51). 

2Melbourne Tigers won head-to-head (3-1).

Finals 

The 2011–12 National Basketball League Finals were played between 30 March 2012 and 25 April 2012, consisting of two best-of-three semi-final and final series, where the higher seed hosted the first and third games.

Playoff Seedings 

 New Zealand Breakers
 Perth Wildcats
 Gold Coast Blaze
 Townsville Crocodiles

The NBL tie-breaker system as outlined in the NBL Rules and Regulations states that in the case of an identical win–loss record, the results in games played between the two teams will determine order of seeding.

Under this system, Cairns did not qualify for the playoffs by equalling Townsville's win–loss record, as the latter held advantage in the tiebreaker (2-2, +51 points).

Playoff bracket

Semi-finals

Grand final

Season statistics

Statistics leaders

Note: regular season only

Top 10 Attendances

Awards

Player of the Week

Player of the Month

Coach of the Month

The end-of-season awards ceremony was held in the Palladium Room at Crown Casino in Melbourne on Monday, 26 March 2012:

Season

Most Valuable Player (Andrew Gaze Trophy): Kevin Lisch, Perth Wildcats
Rookie of the Year: Anatoly Bose, Sydney Kings
Best Defensive Player: Damian Martin, Perth Wildcats
Best Sixth Man: Jesse Wagstaff, Perth Wildcats
Most Improved Player: Daniel Johnson, Adelaide 36ers
Coach of the Year (Lindsay Gaze Trophy): Andrej Lemanis, New Zealand Breakers
Referee of the Year: Michael Aylen
All-NBL First Team:
Kevin Lisch - Perth Wildcats
Cedric Jackson - New Zealand Breakers
Julian Khazzouh - Sydney Kings
Mark Worthington - Gold Coast Blaze
Thomas Abercrombie - New Zealand Breakers
All-NBL Second Team:
Jamar Wilson - Cairns Taipans
Adam Gibson - Gold Coast Blaze
Cameron Tragardh - Melbourne Tigers
Gary Wilkinson - New Zealand Breakers
Peter Crawford - Townsville Crocodiles
All-NBL Third Team:
Daniel Johnson - Adelaide 36ers
Eddie Gill - Townsville Crocodiles
Damian Martin - Perth Wildcats
Adris Deleon - Gold Coast Blaze
Jesse Wagstaff - Perth Wildcats

Finals
Grand Final Series MVP (Larry Sengstock Medal): C. J. Bruton, New Zealand Breakers

References

 
Australia,NBL
2011–12 in Australian basketball
2011 in New Zealand basketball
2012 in New Zealand basketball